Dechang ( is a county of southern Sichuan Province, China. It is under the administration of the Liangshan Yi Autonomous Prefecture.

Climate

References

Liangshan Yi Autonomous Prefecture
Amdo
County-level divisions of Sichuan